Groove Yard is an album by The Montgomery Brothers, released in 1961.

Reception 

In a review for Allmusic, music critic Ken Dryden wrote: "The guitarist and his brothers are in great form throughout the session in spite of the less-than-ideal piano provided. The highlight of the evening in the studio is a foot-tapping version of Carl Perkins' 'Groove Yard,' followed closely by a wild ride through Harold Land's 'Delirium.'... Like most of Wes Montgomery's Riverside recordings, this release is an essential part of his discography and is highly recommended."

Track listing
 "Bock to Bock (Back to Back)" (Buddy Montgomery) – 6:48
 "Groove Yard" (Carl Perkins) – 3:05
 "If I Should Lose You" (Ralph Rainger, Leo Robin) – 5:52
 "Delirium" (Harold Land) – 3:41
 "Just For Now" (Buddy Montgomery) – 5:00
 "Doujie" (Wes Montgomery) – 4:39
 "Heart Strings" (Milt Jackson) – 4:38
 "Remember" (Irving Berlin) – 5:36

The song "Groove Yard" is usually titled "Grooveyard".

Personnel
Wes Montgomery – guitar
Buddy Montgomery – piano
Monk Montgomery – double bass
Bobby Thomas – drums

References

1961 albums
Montgomery Brothers albums
Riverside Records albums
Albums produced by Orrin Keepnews